The CECAFA Club Cup is a football club tournament organised by CECAFA. It has been known as the Kagame Interclub Cup since 2002, when Rwandan President Paul Kagame began sponsoring the competition. It is contested by clubs from East and Central Africa.

Participants

 APR
 Awassa Kenema
 Banaadir Telecom FC
 Miembeni
 Rayon Sport
 Simba
 Tusker FC
 Uganda Revenue Authority SC
 Vital'ô
 Young Africans

Group stage

Group A

Group B

Group C

Third Place Playoff

Final

References

2008
2008 in Tanzanian sport
2008 in African football
2008